The B-52 Victory Museum, Hanoi or Bảo Tàng Chiến Thắng B.52 is located at 157 Đội Cấn, Ba Đình district, Hanoi.

The museum comprises one main building with displays on the history of the Vietnamese revolution, the First Indochina War, the Vietnam War, Operations Rolling Thunder, Linebacker and Linebacker II and the air defense of Hanoi. The outdoor displays include the wreckage of a B-52D or G Stratofortress apparently shot down during Operation Linebacker II (although no specific details are provided) and various air defense equipment.

The museum is open Tuesday-Thursday and Saturday-Sunday from 08:00 to 11:30 and 13:00 to 16:30. Entry is free.

The Museum is located approximately 300m south of the "B-52 lake", Hồ B-52 or Huu Tiep Lake which appears to contain part of the undercarriage section of the B-52 at the Museum. A plaque at the lake states that the aircraft was a B-52G shot down by a Surface-to-air missile (SAM) fired by the 72nd Battalion, 285th Air Defence Missile Regiment on 27 December 1972, however the only B-52s lost that day were two B-52Ds.

Aircraft on display
Aircraft on outside display are:
wreckage of a B-52D or G Stratofortress
Mikoyan-Gurevich MiG-21

Other display items
Also on display outside are:
ZPU-1
ZPU-2
ZPU-4
M1939 37mm AA gun
57 mm AZP S-60
100 mm air defense gun KS-19
Fan Song radar
two SA-2 Guideline SAMs

See also
Vietnam People's Air Force Museum, Hanoi

References

External links
Vietnamese press article on the Museum
Article on the Museum which indicates that the B-52 was a B-52D callsign Rose 1 shot down on 18 December 1972, the first night of Operation Linebacker II

Air force museums
Museums in Hanoi
History museums in Vietnam
Indochina Wars
Vietnam War museums
Military and war museums in Vietnam